Arash is the debut studio album by Iranian-Swedish singer Arash. It was released in 2005.

The singles from the album include "Temptation", "Boro Boro", "Arash", "Bombay Dreams" and "Music Is My Language".

Track listing 
"Tike Tike Kardi"
"Yalla"
"Boro Boro"
"Ey Yar Begoo" (feat. Ebi)
"Temptation" (feat. Rebecca)
"Arash" (feat. Helena)
"Bombay Dreams" (feat. Aneela & Rebecca)
"Man o To"
"Baskon" (feat. Timbuktu)
"Music Is My Language" (feat. DJ Aligator)
"Salamati"
"Behnaz"
"Boro, Boro" (Bollywood Café Mix)
"Tike Tike Kardi" (Payami Lounge Mix)

Charts

References

2005 debut albums
Arash (singer) albums